The Aston Martin Vantage DTM is a "Class 1" touring car constructed by the British car manufacturer Aston Martin for use in the Deutsche Tourenwagen Masters. The Vantage DTM was the first Aston Martin DTM car since its entry to the sport from the 2019 season with the joint-development by HWA. Aston Martin Vantage DTM made DTM début ahead of 2019 DTM season under Class 1 regulations.

Development
HWA AG began development, design and construction of the Vantage DTM chassis in October 2018. The first Vantage DTM chassis was assembled in February 2019, with the first vehicle completed in early-March. Built by HWA AG in Affalterbach, Germany; the completed Vantage DTM was revealed at Circuito de Jerez on 4 March 2019.

Debut
The first shakedown of Aston Martin Vantage DTM was carried by Paul di Resta on 4 March 2019 at Circuito de Jerez.

The Vantage DTM made its official test début at EuroSpeedway Lausitz on 14 April 2019 and made its race début at Hockenheimring on 3 May 2019. The car lasted only one season in the sport, finishing last in the manufacturer's standings, before withdrawing at the end of the season citing cost concerns; the Vantage also did not participate in the non-championship race at Fuji Speedway against Super GT cars.

References

External links
R-Motorsport Official Website

Vantage DTM
Deutsche Tourenwagen Masters cars